Jordan is an unincorporated community in Boone County, Iowa, United States.

History
Jordan was historically called Midway and Harmon's Switch. The present name is after the Jordan River. Jordan was not officially platted. Jordan's population was 12 in 1902, and 26 in 1925.

Jordan was hit by a massive tornado on June 13, 1976. The tornado destroyed virtually every house and business building in the community, but all residents survived. The tornado was accompanied by an F-3 anticyclonic tornado two miles to the southeast. One unusual aspect of the F5 cyclonic tornado and F3 anticyclone tornado was the simultaneous right turn made by each. Dr. Ted Fujita, the originator of the Fujita tornado intensity scale, said the tornado which hit Jordan was one of the most intense and destructive he had ever studied.

Notes

Unincorporated communities in Iowa
Unincorporated communities in Boone County, Iowa
Destroyed towns